Marriage Bureau is a 1913 Swedish silent film directed by Victor Sjöström.

Cast
 Helfrid Lambert as Mrs. Petterkvist
 Victor Lundberg as Petterkvist

References

External links

1913 films
Swedish silent short films
1910s Swedish-language films
Swedish black-and-white films
1913 short films
Films directed by Victor Sjöström